KSDL (92.3 FM, "Awesome 92.3") is a radio station licensed to serve Sedalia, Missouri, United States.  The station is owned by Townsquare Media and the license is held by Townsquare License, LLC.  It broadcasts a classic hits music format.

History
In November 1986, Yates Broadcasting Co., Inc., reached an agreement to sell KCBW to Bick Broadcasting Company.  The deal was approved by the FCC on December 9, 1986, and the transaction was consummated on December 30, 1986.

The station was assigned new call letters KSDL by the Federal Communications Commission on August 10, 1992.

In May 2006, Bick Broadcasting Company reached an agreement to sell this station to Double O Radio holding company Double O Missouri Corporation.  The deal was approved by the FCC on June 30, 2006, and the transaction was consummated on August 31, 2006. Double O Radio later merged with Townsquare Media.

On March 28, 2019, the station rebranded from Bob FM to Awesome 92.3.

Previous Logos

References

External links

SDL
Classic hits radio stations in the United States
Bob FM stations
Pettis County, Missouri
Radio stations established in 1986
1964 establishments in Missouri
Townsquare Media radio stations